Precautionary statements form part of the Globally Harmonized System of Classification and Labelling of Chemicals (GHS). They are intended to form a set of standardized phrases giving advice about the correct handling of chemical substances and mixtures, which can be translated into different languages. As such, they serve the same purpose as the well-known S-phrases, which they are intended to replace.

Precautionary statements are one of the key elements for the labelling of containers under the GHS, along with:
an identification of the product;
one or more hazard pictograms (where necessary)
a signal word – either Danger or Warning – where necessary
hazard statements, indicating the nature and degree of the risks posed by the product
the identity of the supplier (who might be a manufacturer or importer)

Each precautionary statement is designated a code, starting with the letter P and followed by three digits. Statements which correspond to related hazards are grouped together by code number, so the numbering is not consecutive. The code is used for reference purposes, for example to help with translations, but it is the actual phrase which should appear on labels and safety data sheets. Some precautionary phrases are combinations, indicated by a plus sign "+". In several cases, there is a choice of wording, for example "Avoid breathing dust/fume/gas/mist/vapours/spray": the supplier or regulatory agency should choose the appropriate wording for the product concerned.

General precautionary statements 

Note: "" = to be specified

Prevention precautionary statements

Response precautionary statements

Storage precautionary statements

Disposal precautionary statements

References

External links 
("GHS Rev.2")
(the "CLP Regulation")
 Chemical Hazard & Precautionary Phrases in 23 European Languages, machine-readable and versioned

Precautionary statements